From These Waters is the sixth studio album released by the Swedish progressive metal band, Loch Vostok. The album was released worldwide on 27 March 2015. This album was recorded and mixed at Blueflame Productions in Sweden.

Loch Vostok released a music video for the title track on YouTube on 10 July 2015, and the album received overall good reviews internationally.

Track listing

Credits
Teddy Möller – vocals, guitar
Niklas Kupper – guitar, vocals
Fredrik Klingwall – keyboard
Jimmy Mattsson – bass guitar
Lawrence Dinamarca – drums

References

External links

From These Waters YouTube.

2015 albums
Loch Vostok albums